Abdoulie Bojang is a Gambian politician who was is the Speaker of the National Assembly of the Gambia from 2010 to 2017.

Early life 
Bojang worked as a teacher before becoming a politician.

Political career 
Bojang was nominated as a member of the National Assembly following the 2007 parliamentary election. He was elected as Deputy Speaker of the National Assembly of the Gambia on 8 February 2007 before his appointment as Speaker on 12 November 2010. He was nominated to serve as Speaker by Fabakary Jatta, the Majority Leader. He was unanimously re-elected to serve as Speaker following the 2012 election.

References 

Living people
Gambian politicians
Speakers of the National Assembly of the Gambia
Year of birth missing (living people)